Dennis Vélez Barlucea is a Puerto Rican politician from the New Progressive Party (PNP). He served as member of the 20th Senate of Puerto Rico from 1993 to 1997.

Vélez was elected to the Senate of Puerto Rico in the 1992 general election. He represented the District of Ponce, along with Eddie Zavála Vázquez.

Vélez ran again for the 1996 general election, but lost to the candidates of the Popular Democratic Party (PPD).

See also
21st Senate of Puerto Rico

References

Living people
Members of the Senate of Puerto Rico
People from Adjuntas, Puerto Rico
Year of birth missing (living people)
New Progressive Party (Puerto Rico) politicians